The Lewis and Clark River Bridge is a bascule bridge that spans the Lewis and Clark River on U.S. Route 101 Business (a section originally part of U.S. Route 101) in Clatsop County, Oregon.  It was designed by Conde McCullough and opened in 1925.  It was built to replace an earlier bridge at the same location, a swing-span bridge constructed around 1910.

The approach spans consist of a total of 48 timber pile and stringer spans.

See also
List of bridges documented by the Historic American Engineering Record in Oregon

References

Bibliography
Hadlow, Robert W. (2001). Elegant Arches, Soaring Spans: C. B. McCullough, Oregon's Master Bridge Builder. Oregon State University Press. .

External links

Bascule bridges in the United States
Bridges completed in 1925
U.S. Route 101
Road bridges in Oregon
Historic American Engineering Record in Oregon
Bridges by Conde McCullough
Bridges of the United States Numbered Highway System
1924 establishments in Oregon
Transportation buildings and structures in Clatsop County, Oregon